The New South Wales 85 class were a class of 10 electric locomotives built by Comeng, Granville between May 1979 and July 1980 for the Public Transport Commission.

When introduced they were the most powerful locomotives in Australia with a rating of 2,880 kW. Based at Lithgow depot they were purchased principally to haul coal trains over the Blue Mountains line. They also hauled other freight trains and on occasions passenger services including the Indian Pacific.

Following the Illawarra line being electrified in 1986, 85s began to operate coal trains from Lithgow through to Port Kembla. They also occasionally hauled coal services from Glenlee Colliery on the Main South line to Port Kembla and Rozelle. They did not operate on the Main North line although in 1993 all were hauled to Taree for repainting at Landsdowne Engineering.

A combination of National Rail electing to use diesel locomotives on electrified lines and a move to an open access model in New South Wales resulting in electric traction being priced out of the market saw the need for electric traction drop. In April 1998, the 85 class were withdrawn and stored at Lithgow.

In July 2000, FreightCorp moved three of the class to Werris Creek. Two were sold for preservation, 8501 to the Sydney Electric Train Society and 8507 to the Dorrigo Steam Railway & Museum.  The remainder were sold in 2003 to Silverton Rail and scrapped at Broken Hill.

References

Co-Co locomotives
Commonwealth Engineering locomotives
Electric locomotives of New South Wales
Railway locomotives introduced in 1979
Standard gauge locomotives of Australia
1500 V DC locomotives